Comeback, The Comeback or Come Back may refer to:

General
 Comeback (publicity), a return to prominence by a well-known person
 Comeback (retort), a witty response to an insult or criticism
 Comeback (sports), an event where an athlete or team losing a contest by a wide margin ultimately prevails
 The Comeback (American football), a 1993 NFL playoff game between the Buffalo Bills and the Houston Oilers
 Comeback (sheep), a breed of domestic sheep
 Comeback sauce, a dipping sauce for fried foods or as a salad dressing in the cuisine of central Mississippi

Film
The Comeback (1978 film), also known as The Day the Screaming Stopped, a British horror film
The Comeback (1980 film), a documentary about Arnold Schwarzenegger
The Comeback (2001 film), an Italian independent drama film
The Comeback (2010 film), aka Cabotins, a Canadian comedy film directed by Alain Desrochers
The Comeback (2015 film), a Filipino independent comedy film by Ivan Andrew Payawal starring Kaye Abad
Comeback (film), a 1982 film starring Eric Burdon
Comeback (1983 film), or Love Is Forever, a film by Hall Bartlett, starring Michael Landon
The Comebacks, a 2007 comedy film
Come-Back!, a 1981 Dutch film

Music
 Comeback (K-pop), a Korean pop music marketing term for promotions of an artist's single or album that is not their debut

Albums
Comeback (Eric Burdon album), 1982
Comeback (Tic Tac Toe album), 2006
The Comeback (Zac Brown Band album), 2021
The Comeback (EP), by Stars, 2001
Comeback: Single Collection '90–'94, by Bonnie Tyler, 1994
The Comeback, by Baby Rasta & Gringo, 2008

Songs
"Come Back" (Chicane song), 2010
"Come Back" (Jessica Garlick song), 2002
"Come Back" (The J. Geils Band song), 1980
"Comeback" (Ella Eyre song), 2014
"Comeback" (Grinspoon song), 2009
"The Comeback" (song), by Danny Gokey, 2017
"Come Back", by Algebra from Purpose
"Come Back", by Bananarama from Wow!
"Come Back", by Ben Platt from Reverie
"Come Back", by Depeche Mode from Sounds of the Universe
"Come Back", by Foo Fighters from One by One
"Come Back", by iamnot
"Come Back", by Johnny Mathis
"Come Back", by Lazlo Bane from Back Sides
"Come Back", by The Mighty Wah!
"Come Back", by Pearl Jam from Pearl Jam
"Come Back", by Usher featuring Jermaine Dupri from My Way
"Come Back (Before You Leave)", by Roxette from Tourism
"Comeback", by Eric Burdon from Power Company
"Comeback", by Jonas Brothers from Happiness Begins
"Comeback", by Kelly Rowland from Ms. Kelly
"The Comeback", by Big Pooh from The Delightful Bars
"The Comeback", by Gomez from Bring It On
"The Comeback", by Joe Williams from Count Basie Swings, Joe Williams Sings
"The Comeback", by Shout Out Louds from Howl Howl Gaff Gaff

Television
Comeback (TV series), a Czech sitcom
The Comeback (TV series), a series produced by HBO
The Comeback (1997 TV series), a drama series produced by Asia Television Limited
"The Comeback" (Seinfeld), a 1997 episode of Seinfeld
"Comeback" (Glee), a 2011 episode of Glee
"Comeback" (Land of the Giants), a 1969 episode of Land of the Giants

Literature
The Comeback (novel), a 1985 novel by Ed Vega
The Comeback (play), a 2020 comedy by Ben Ashenden and Alex Owen of the double act The Pin
The Comeback, a play by A. R. Gurney

See also

Comeback Kid (disambiguation)
Come Back, Little Sheba (disambiguation)
Comeback season (disambiguation)